Streptomyces phytohabitans is a bacterium species from the genus of Streptomyces which has been isolated from the plant Curcuma phaeocaulis from the Sichuan Province in China. Streptomyces phytohabitans produces the macrolides novonestmycin A and novonestmycin B.

See also 
 List of Streptomyces species

References

Further reading

External links
Type strain of Streptomyces phytohabitans at BacDive -  the Bacterial Diversity Metadatabase	

phytohabitans
Bacteria described in 2012